The gymnosperms (  lit. revealed seeds) are a group of seed-producing plants that includes conifers, cycads, Ginkgo, and gnetophytes, forming the clade Gymnospermae. The name is based on the unenclosed condition of their seeds (called ovules in their unfertilized state). The non-encased condition of their seeds contrasts with the seeds and ovules of flowering plants (angiosperms), which are enclosed within an ovary. Gymnosperm seeds develop either on the surface of scales or leaves, which are often modified to form cones, or on their own as in yew, Torreya, Ginkgo. Gymnosperm lifecycles involve alternation of generations. They have a dominant diploid sporophyte phase and a reduced haploid gametophyte phase which is dependent on the sporophytic phase. The term "gymnosperm" is often used in paleobotany to refer to (the paraphyletic group of) all non-angiosperm seed plants. In that case, to specify the modern monophyletic group of gymnosperms, the term Acrogymnospermae is sometimes used.

The gymnosperms and angiosperms together comprise the spermatophytes or seed plants. The gymnosperms are subdivided into five Divisions, four of which, the Cycadophyta, Ginkgophyta, Gnetophyta, and Pinophyta (also known as Coniferophyta) are still in existence while the Pteridospermatophyta are now extinct. Newer classification place the gnetophytes among the conifers.

By far the largest group of living gymnosperms are the conifers (pines, cypresses, and relatives), followed by cycads, gnetophytes (Gnetum, Ephedra and Welwitschia), and Ginkgo biloba (a single living species). About 65% of gymnosperms are dioecious, but conifers are almost all monoecious.

Some genera have mycorrhiza, fungal associations with roots (Pinus), while in some others (Cycas) small specialised roots called coralloid roots are associated with nitrogen-fixing cyanobacteria.

Diversity and origin

Over 1000 living species of gymnosperm exist. It was previously widely accepted that the gymnosperms originated in the Late Carboniferous period, replacing the lycopsid rainforests of the tropical region, but more recent phylogenetic evidence indicates that they diverged from the ancestors of angiosperms during the Early Carboniferous. Early characteristics of seed plants are evident in fossil progymnosperms of the late Devonian period around 383 million years ago. It has been suggested that during the mid-Mesozoic era, pollination of some extinct groups of gymnosperms was by extinct species of scorpionflies that had specialized proboscis for feeding on pollination drops. The scorpionflies likely engaged in pollination mutualisms with gymnosperms, long before the similar and independent coevolution of nectar-feeding insects on angiosperms. Evidence has also been found that mid-Mesozoic gymnosperms were pollinated by Kalligrammatid lacewings, a now-extinct family with members which (in an example of convergent evolution) resembled the modern butterflies that arose far later.

All gymnosperms are perennial woody plants, apart from the cycads. The soft and highly parenchymatous wood in cycads is poorly lignified, and their main structural support comes from an armor of sclerenchymatous leaf bases covering the stem, with the exception of species with underground stems. There are no herbaceous gymnosperms and compared to angiosperms they occupy fewer ecological niches, but have evolved both parasites (Parasitaxus), epiphytes (Zamia pseudoparasitica) and rheophytes (Retrophyllum minus).

Conifers are by far the most abundant extant group of gymnosperms with six to eight families, with a total of 65–70 genera and 600–630 species (696 accepted names). Most conifers are evergreens. The leaves of many conifers are long, thin and needle-like, other species, including most Cupressaceae and some Podocarpaceae, have flat, triangular scale-like leaves. Agathis in Araucariaceae and Nageia in Podocarpaceae have broad, flat strap-shaped leaves.

Cycads are the next most abundant group of gymnosperms, with two or three families, 11 genera, and approximately 338 species. A majority of cycads are native to tropical climates and are most abundantly found in regions near the equator. The other extant groups are the 95–100 species of Gnetales and one species of Ginkgo.

Today gymnosperms are the most threatened of all plant groups.

Classification

A formal classification of the living gymnosperms is the "Acrogymnospermae", which form a monophyletic group within the spermatophytes. The wider "Gymnospermae" group includes extinct gymnosperms and is thought to be paraphyletic. The fossil record of gymnosperms includes many distinctive taxa that do not belong to the four modern groups, including seed-bearing trees that have a somewhat fern-like vegetative morphology (the so-called "seed ferns" or pteridosperms). When fossil gymnosperms such as these and the Bennettitales, glossopterids, and Caytonia are considered, it is clear that angiosperms are nested within a larger gymnospermae clade, although which group of gymnosperms is their closest relative remains unclear.

The extant gymnosperms include 12 main families and 83 genera which contain more than 1000 known species.

Subclass Cycadidae
Order Cycadales
Family Cycadaceae: Cycas
Family Zamiaceae: Dioon, Bowenia, Macrozamia, Lepidozamia, Encephalartos, Stangeria, Ceratozamia, Microcycas, Zamia

Subclass Ginkgoidae
Order Ginkgoales
Family Ginkgoaceae: Ginkgo

Subclass Gnetidae
Order Welwitschiales
Family Welwitschiaceae: Welwitschia
Order Gnetales
Family Gnetaceae: Gnetum
Order Ephedrales
Family Ephedraceae: Ephedra

Subclass Pinidae
Order Pinales
Family Pinaceae: Cedrus, Pinus, Cathaya, Picea, Pseudotsuga, Larix, Pseudolarix, Tsuga, Nothotsuga, Keteleeria, Abies

Order Araucariales
Family Araucariaceae: Araucaria, Wollemia, Agathis
Family Podocarpaceae: Phyllocladus, Lepidothamnus, Prumnopitys, Sundacarpus, Halocarpus, Parasitaxus, Lagarostrobos, Manoao, Saxegothaea, Microcachrys, Pherosphaera, Acmopyle, Dacrycarpus, Dacrydium, Falcatifolium, Retrophyllum, Nageia, Afrocarpus, Podocarpus

Order Cupressales
Family Sciadopityaceae: Sciadopitys
Family Cupressaceae: Cunninghamia, Taiwania, Athrotaxis, Metasequoia, Sequoia, Sequoiadendron, Cryptomeria, Glyptostrobus, Taxodium, Papuacedrus, Austrocedrus, Libocedrus, Pilgerodendron, Widdringtonia, Diselma, Fitzroya, Callitris, Actinostrobus, Neocallitropsis, Thujopsis, Thuja, Fokienia, Chamaecyparis,  Cupressus, Juniperus, Calocedrus, Tetraclinis, Platycladus, Microbiota
Family Taxaceae: Austrotaxus, Pseudotaxus, Taxus, Cephalotaxus, Amentotaxus, Torreya

Extinct groupings 
 Division Pteridospermatophyta
 Order Bennettitales
 Family Cycadeoidaceae
 Family Williamsoniaceae
 Order Erdtmanithecales
Order Pentoxylales
Order Czekanowskiales

Life cycle

Gymnosperms, like all vascular plants, have a sporophyte-dominant life cycle, which means they spend most of their life cycle with diploid cells, while the gametophyte (gamete-bearing phase) is relatively short-lived. Like all seed plants, they are heterosporous, having two spore types, microspores (male) and megaspores (female) that are typically produced in pollen cones or ovulate cones, respectively. The exception is the females in the cycad genus Cycas, which form a loose structure called megasporophylls instead of cones. As with all heterosporous plants, the gametophytes develop within the spore wall. Pollen grains (microgametophytes) mature from microspores, and ultimately produce sperm cells. Megagametophytes develop from megaspores and are retained within the ovule. Gymnosperms produce multiple archegonia, which produce the female gamete. 

During pollination, pollen grains are physically transferred between plants from the pollen cone to the ovule. Pollen is usually moved by wind or insects. Whole grains enter each ovule through a microscopic gap in the ovule coat (integument) called the micropyle. The pollen grains mature further inside the ovule and produce sperm cells. Two main modes of fertilization are found in gymnosperms. Cycads and Ginkgo have flagellated motile sperm that swim directly to the egg inside the ovule, whereas conifers and gnetophytes have sperm with no flagella that are moved along a pollen tube to the egg. After syngamy (joining of the sperm and egg cell), the zygote develops into an embryo (young sporophyte). More than one embryo is usually initiated in each gymnosperm seed. The mature seed comprises the embryo and the remains of the female gametophyte, which serves as a food supply, and the seed coat.

Genetics

The first published sequenced genome for any gymnosperm was the genome of Picea abies in 2013.

Uses

Gymnosperms have major economic uses.  Pine, fir, spruce, and cedar are all examples of conifers that are used for lumber, paper production, and resin. Some other common uses for gymnosperms are soap, varnish, nail polish, food, gum, and perfumes.

References

General bibliography

External links

Gymnosperm Database
Gymnosperms on the Tree of Life

 01
Extant Late Devonian first appearances